Amândio Manuel Filipe da Costa best known as Amaro (born November 12, 1986) is an Angolan footballer who plays for FC Bravos do Maquis as a midfielder in the Angolan premier league Girabola.

Club career
Amaro played for Benfica de Luanda between 2006 and 2010, before joining Primeiro de Agosto  in 2011.

In 2017, he signed in for Kabuscorp.

In 2019-20, he signed in for Bravos do Maquis in the Angolan league, the Girabola.

International career
Amaro also has been capped by the Angolan national football team with his debut taking place in 2008.

International goals
Scores and results list Angola's goal tally first.

References

1986 births
Living people
Angolan footballers
Angola international footballers
Association football defenders
C.D. Primeiro de Agosto players
F.C. Bravos do Maquis players
Kabuscorp S.C.P. players
S.L. Benfica (Luanda) players
Girabola players
2012 Africa Cup of Nations players
2013 Africa Cup of Nations players
2011 African Nations Championship players
Angola A' international footballers